A Pattern Language: Towns, Buildings, Construction is a 1977 book on architecture, urban design, and community livability.  It was authored by Christopher Alexander, Sara Ishikawa and Murray Silverstein of the Center for Environmental Structure of Berkeley, California, with writing credits also to Max Jacobson, Ingrid Fiksdahl-King and Shlomo Angel. Decades after its publication, it is still one of the best-selling books on architecture.

The book creates a new language, what the authors call a pattern language derived from timeless entities called patterns. As they write on page xxxv of the introduction, "All 253 patterns together form a language." Patterns describe a problem and then offer a solution. In doing so the authors intend to give ordinary people, not only professionals, a way to work with their neighbors to improve a town or neighborhood, design a house for themselves or work with colleagues to design an office, workshop, or public building such as a school.

Structure 
Written in the 1970s at the University of California, Berkeley, A Pattern Language is structured as a network, where each pattern may have a statement referenced to another pattern by placing that pattern's number in brackets, for example: (12) means go to the Community of 7,000 pattern. In this way, it is structured as a hypertext.

It includes 253 patterns, such as Community of 7000 (Pattern 12) given a treatment over several pages; page 71 states: "Individuals have no effective voice in any community of more than 5,000–10,000 persons." It is written as a set of problems and documented solutions.

According to Alexander & team, the work originated from an observation 

The book uses words to describe patterns, supported by drawings, photographs, and charts. It describes exact methods for constructing practical, safe, and attractive designs at every scale, from entire regions, through cities, neighborhoods, gardens, buildings, rooms, built-in furniture, and fixtures down to the level of doorknobs. The patterns are regarded by the authors not as infallible, but as hypotheses: 

Some patterns focus on materials, noting some ancient systems, such as concrete, during adaption by modern technology, may become one of the best future materials:  Other patterns focus on life experiences such as the Street Cafe (Pattern 88):

Grouping these patterns, the authors say, they form a kind of language, each pattern forming a word or thought of a true language rather than a prescriptive way to design or solve a problem. As the authors write on p xiii, "Each solution is stated in such a way, it gives the essential field of relationships needed to solve the problem, but in a very general and abstract way—so you can solve the problem, in your way, by adapting it to your preferences, and the local conditions at the place you are making it."

A notable value is the architectural system consists only of timeless patterns tested in the real world, then reviewed by multiple architects for beauty and practicality. The patterns include provision for future modification and repair, in keeping with the principle the most-satisfying living spaces are those which, like the lives of their occupants, tend to change and evolve over time.

The book values human rights such as freedom, and it shows how architecture can enhance or reduce an individual's sense of freedom

Reception 
This book's method was adopted by the University of Oregon, as described in The Oregon Experiment, and remains the official planning instrument.  It is adopted, in part, by some government agents   as a building code.

Alexander's conception of patterns, and pattern languages, were major factors in the creation of Ward Cunningham's WikiWikiWeb, the first wiki, intended as an archive and discussion web application for the Portland Pattern Repository.

The idea of a pattern language applies to many complex engineering tasks. It is especially influential in software engineering using design patterns to document collective knowledge in the field. In that field, it was a major inspiration to Richard P. Gabriel before he wrote Patterns of Software.

Will Wright cited the book as one of his inspirations for creating The Sims.

Other titles in the series 
The eight books in the Center for Environmental Structure Series are:
 The Timeless Way of Building (volume 1)
 A Pattern Language: Towns, Buildings, Construction (volume 2)
 The Oregon Experiment (volume 3)
 The Production of Houses (volume 4)
 The Linz Café (volume 5)
 A New Theory of Urban Design (volume 6)
 A Foreshadowing of 21st Century Art (volume 7)
 The Mary Rose Museum (volume 8)

References

Further reading
 Christopher Alexander, Sara Ishikawa, Murray Silverstein (1974). 'A Collection of Patterns which Generate Multi-Service Centres' in Declan and Margrit Kennedy (eds.): The Inner City. Architects Year Book 14, Elek, London. .
 Alexander, C. (1979). The Timeless Way of Building. USA: Oxford University Press. .
 Grabow, Stephen: Christopher Alexander: The Search for a New Paradigm in Architecture, Routledge & Kegan Paul, London and Boston, 1983.
 Schuler, D. (2008). Liberating Voices: A Pattern Language for Communication Revolution. USA: MIT Press. .
 Leitner, Helmut (2015): Pattern Theory: Introduction and Perspectives on the Tracks of Christopher Alexander. .

External links 
 Pattern Language - Official web site of Christopher Alexander.

1977 non-fiction books
Architecture books
Vernacular architecture
Architectural theory
Books about urbanism
Oxford University Press books